Amir Hatami is an Iranian regular army (Artesh) officer with the rank of Brigadier general and Advisor to the Commander-in-Chief of the Iranian Armed Forces of Army Affairs and the former minister of defense of Iran. He was designated as the defense minister by President Hassan Rouhani on 8 August 2017 and gained vote of confidence from the parliament on 20 August 2017, with 261 yes, 10 nays, 13 abstentions and 4 invalid votes.

He is the first minister of defense with Artesh background in more than two decades, an office held by Revolutionary Guards officers only since 1989.

Hatami previously served as the head of the Army's international relations office, as well as a deputy in the armed forces general staff.

References

Living people
Iranian Vice Ministers
Islamic Republic of Iran Army brigadier generals
Islamic Republic of Iran Army personnel of the Iran–Iraq War
Volunteer Basij personnel of the Iran–Iraq War
Defence ministers of Iran
Year of birth missing (living people)